Dasymutilla occidentalis (red velvet ant, eastern velvet ant, cow ant or cow killer), is a species of parasitoid wasp native to the eastern United States. It is commonly mistaken for a member of the true ant family, as the female is wingless. The species ranges from Connecticut to Kansas in the north and  Florida to Texas in the south.

The eastern velvet ant is the largest of the velvet ant species in the eastern United States, attaining an approximate length of 0.75 in (1.9 cm). Adults display aposematic coloration, consisting of black overall coloring with an orange-red pattern on the dorsal surface of the thorax and abdomen. They are covered in dense, velvet-like hair.

Description and biology
Commonly mistaken for an ant, because of its appearance and its common name, it is a parasitoid wasp species in which the females are wingless, as is true for all females of Mutillidae. It can be recognized by its distinctive red coloring, with a black stripe that goes across the abdomen. Females are capable of an extremely painful sting, hence the name "cow killer". They are quick-moving and often take a defensive posture when threatened. Instead of creating nests, the females seek out the brood cells of Eastern cicada killers and horse guard wasps as well as other large ground-nesting members of Crabronidae, where they deposit an egg onto a host larva. The egg quickly hatches into a white, legless grub, which consumes the host and goes through several larval stages prior to pupation. Unlike the females, males have dark, translucent wings and do not possess a sting. Males fly low over grass in search of mates. Both sexes make a squeaking noise (stridulation) to warn potential predators (another form of aposematism in females, and automimicry in males).

Defense
The velvet ant has multiple defensive strategies, but is best known for its extremely painful sting, earning it the nickname of "cow killer". Its defenses include a thickened exoskeleton, the ability to run fast and evasively, warning coloration, stridulatory warning sounds, a chemical secretion, and venom.

References

External links
 

Mutillidae
Hymenoptera of North America
Insects of the United States
Aposematic species
Wasps described in 1758
Taxa named by Carl Linnaeus